The black phantom tetra (Hyphessobrycon megalopterus), or simply phantom tetra, is a small freshwater fish of the characin family (Characidae) of order Characiformes. It is native to the upper Paraguay basin and upper Madeira basin (including Guaporé, Mamore and Beni) in Brazil and Bolivia. It is commonly seen in the aquarium trade.

Appearance
This fish is of roughly tetragonal shape, light grey in coloring, with a black patch, surrounded by iridescent silver edging, posterior of the gills on each side. The male's fins are black, as is the female's dorsal fin; the female's pelvic, anal, and 
adipose fins are reddish in color. A long-finned variety, apparently developed by captive breeders, is sometimes sold in the aquarium trade (the male has elongated dorsal and anal fins even in the wild form).

Sex 

The male black phantom tetras have longer fins than the females and when in breeding condition, the females become plumper, but the biggest difference is in their color. The males have no red, while the smaller fins of the female both on the top and underneath them are red. The adipose fin, on the top of the body behind the larger dorsal fin, is much more noticeable in the females than the males, because in females it is red while in the males it is grey. The female's dorsal fin has a more intense black than the male's. When the fish are in breeding condition, the colors of both sexes become more distinct, with the male showing its black fins more obviously.

Feeding
The black phantom tetra's natural diet consist of small crustaceans, insects, and worms.

In the aquarium

H. megalopterus is one of the more popular tetras sold in the aquarium trade. While it is not particularly colorful, it makes up for this by its display behavior: the males are territorial and defend their space against their neighbors by presenting themselves in profile with the dorsal and anal fins fully extended, and the dark color intensified, making the edging of the body patch stand out prominently. Sometimes they exchange blows which can tear the fins, but this damage heals quickly. Unlike other tetras who prefer to live in large shoals, they will also do fine when kept in a group of four or five individuals, making them suitable for smaller aquaria. There should still be enough space for the males to stake territories and present themselves to best effort, however.

Breeding
The fish should be well conditioned to induce spawning. When possible, live foods are included in the conditioning period. Frozen foods like bloodworms are also used as conditioning food.

The Black phantom tetra is an egg-scattering species. To stimulate breeding, pH is lowered to about 5.5-6, the general hardness of the water is also reduced below four degrees. The breeding tank should have plants, both rooted and floating, and low light.

A female black phantom tetra will produce about 300 eggs. These fish will eat their own eggs and fry, so the parents are usually removed after spawning.

Raising the fry
The babies are fed infusoria (protozoa) at first. Commercial fry foods of suitable sizes can be used but at all stages the young fish benefit from live food of the right size.

See also

Community fish
List of freshwater aquarium fish species

References

 
 https://web.archive.org/web/20130811112753/http://bettatrading.com.au/Black-Phantom-Tetra.php

Fish described in 1915
Taxa named by Carl H. Eigenmann
Tetras
Characidae